Monet: The Mystery of the Orangery (French: Monet: Le Mystère de l'Orangerie) is a 2000 educational adventure game developed by index+ and Media Factory, and published by Wanadoo Edition on Windows. The title and the game reference the Musée de l'Orangerie in Paris, France, where eight large Water Lilly paintings by Claude Monet are exhibited.

Plot and gameplay 
The player has been tasked by the French government to restore the Orangery, however a wealthy oil-banker proves to the game's antagonist as they put profits over art.

The gameplay sees the player interacting with characters, traveling to locations (including Monet's paintings rendered in 3D), and locating clues.

Development 
It is difficult to play the game on modern hardware.

Critical reception 
Four Fat Chicks praised it as a "surprisingly unpretentious little game". Adventure Archiv felt the game was enjoyable family-friendly fare despite its brevity. Rock Paper Shotgun noted, upon reviewing 2016's IMPRESSIONISTa, that the concept of stepping into a Monet painting had already been done with this title. Similarly, Metzomagic noted Monet had explored the concept before Mission Sunlight.

References

External links 

 Absolute Games review

Adventure games
Windows games
Windows-only games
2000 video games
Video games developed in France
Educational video games
Cultural depictions of Claude Monet